= Nedgame =

Dutch video game retailer

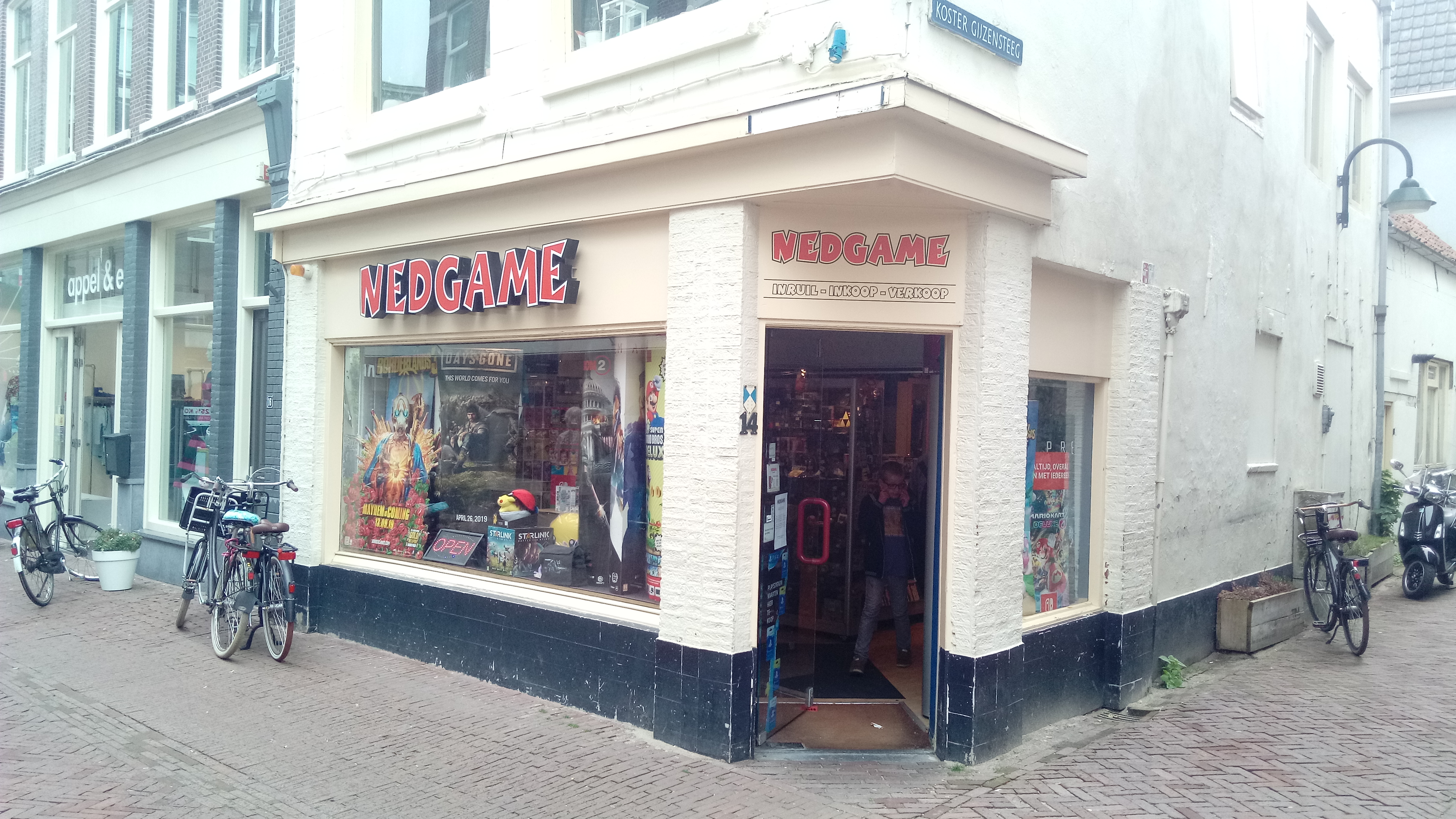
- A Nedgame store in Gouda
- Company type: Privately owned
- Industry: Video games
- Website: nedgame.nl

Nedgame is a video game retailer in the Netherlands, and is with its 11 stores the biggest privately owned video game retailer in the Netherlands. They specialize in selling new and used games, consoles, accessories and game merchandise.

In September 2009, Nedgame's decision not to support Sony's new PSP Go made international headlines, as a number of video game retailers worldwide followed.
